Pamba Sports Club is a Tanzanian football club based in Mwanza established in 1968 that plays in the Championship.

In 1990 the team won the Tanzanian Premier League.

Honours
Tanzanian Premier League: 1990
Nyerere Cup: 1989, 1992

Performance in CAF competitions
CAF Confederation Cup: 1 appearance
1991 African Cup of Champions Clubs – First Round

Appeared in the African winner's Cup in 1990 and won the preliminary round with a record 17 -1 goals aggregate when they played Anse-aux-Pins of Seychelles

Stadium
Their home games are played at CCM Kirumba Stadium.

Squad

References

External links
Head to head stats – WildStat.com
Team website – Facebook

Football clubs in Tanzania